The Obelisk of Montevideo, officially listed as the Obelisco a los Constituyentes de 1830, is a monument created by sculptor José Luis Zorrilla de San Martín (1891-1975). It has a hexagonal water fountain around it with six spheres on its outer circumference. It is located at the intersection of 18 de Julio and Artigas Boulevard avenues, in Montevideo, at the entrance of the Parque Batlle area. It was built in 1930 to celebrate the 100th anniversary of the first Constitution of Uruguay and is an homage to the participants of the General Assembly of the first Constitution.

Six years later, a similar but larger monument was built at the intersection of 9 de Julio and Corrientes avenues in Buenos Aires, to celebrate the 400th anniversary of the first founding of the city.

See also 
18 de Julio Avenue
Artigas Boulevard
Parque Batlle
Constitution of Uruguay

References 

Obelisks
Monuments and memorials in Montevideo
Tres Cruces